Rodrigo Bandeira da Costa (born 20 December 1993) is a Brazilian footballer who plays as a midfielder for FC Tulsa in the USL Championship.

References

External links
 

1993 births
Living people
Association football midfielders
Brazilian expatriate footballers
FC Tulsa players
USL Championship players
Florida Memorial Lions
College men's soccer players in the United States
United Premier Soccer League players
Brazilian expatriate sportspeople in the United States
Expatriate soccer players in the United States
Footballers from Rio de Janeiro (city)
Brazilian footballers